Tianyi Square was the biggest square in Ningbo, Zhejiang province, China designed by architect Qingyun Ma.

Location

History
It was completed in 2002. The Square is surrounded by 22 different buildings with a European style. In the central part, there is an open area covering  and a water area covering  which includes pools and fountain. The fountain can turn into different shapes and styles, such as mineral-flower-style and waltz-flower-style. Near the fountain, there is a water screen where tourists can watch movies. There is also a typical Gothic Church in front of the square. 

Tianyi Square is also the biggest multi-function square in China. It won the prize for the best public art construction after being completed in 2003.

Sections
The Square is divided into 10 sections, including supermarket area, retail area, electronics area, souvenir area, clothing area, hotel area, entertainment area, restaurant area, children’s area and a mixed area. There are a total of about 300 shops in the Square. Tian Yi Square provides tourists and citizens with a fashionable and pleasant paradise for relaxing and shopping. It is also a lively and important commercial area for business and trade in Ningbo.

References

Economy in Ningbo
Squares in Ningbo